The 1981 British National Track Championships were a series of track cycling competitions held from 31 July – 8 August 1981 at the Leicester Velodrome.

The weather caused a major problem with cancellations of many events.

Medal summary

Men's Events

Women's Events

References

1981 in British sport
July 1981 sports events in the United Kingdom
August 1981 sports events in the United Kingdom